Messina was a cargo steamship that Neptun Werft of Rostock, Germany built in 1937 for Robert M. Sloman Jr, Hamburg. In 1940 the Kriegsmarine requisitioned her. In 1945 the UK seized her as a war prize, passed to the Ministry of War Transport (MoWT) who renamed her Empire Cherwell. In 1947 she was transferred to the USSR and renamed Polus (Полюс). She may have survived until the early 1960s. Her name was removed from shipping registers in 1961 and her ultimate fate is unknown.

Sister ships
Messina was the last to be built in a series of sister ships for Robert M. Sloman Jr. In 1934 Deutsche Werft of Hamburg built Alicante and H. C. Stülcken Sohn, also of Hamburg, built Savona. In 1935 Deutsche Werft built Castellon, and Neptun Werft built Catania and Malaga. In 1937 Neptun Werft built Messina.

Description
Neptun Werft launched and completed Messina in 1937.

Like most of her sisters, Messina was propelled by a four-cylinder compound steam engine plus a Bauer-Wach exhaust steam turbine. Christiansen & Meyer of Harburg built the engines. Her combined reciprocating and turbine machinery was rated at 312 NHP.

History
Robert M. Sloman Jr registered Messina in Hamburg. Her call sign was DJUT. In 1940 the Kriegsmarine requisitioned her. In May 1945 the Allies seized her as a war prize at Travemünde. She was passed to the MoWT and renamed Empire Cherwell. She was given the UK official number was 180718, her call sign was changed to GPSZ, and her port of registry was changed to London. Empire Cherwell operated under the management of F. Carrick & Co Ltd.

In 1946 Empire Cherwell was transferred to the USSR. She was renamed Полюс, and her port of registry was changed to Leningrad. Her name was transliterated as "Polus" in Lloyd's Register, although a more correct pronunciation would be "Polyus".

Lloyd's Register still recorded Polus in 1960. Her name was removed from the register in 1961.

References

Bibliography

1937 ships
Ships built in Rostock
Steamships of Germany
World War II merchant ships of Germany
Merchant ships of Germany
Auxiliary ships of the Kriegsmarine
Empire ships
Ministry of War Transport ships
Steamships of the United Kingdom
Merchant ships of the United Kingdom
Steamships of the Soviet Union
Merchant ships of the Soviet Union
Soviet Union–United Kingdom relations
Germany–Soviet Union relations